Liutgard of Saxony may refer to:

Liutgard of Saxony (died 885) (845–885), daughter of the Saxon count Liudolf and wife of King Louis the Younger of East Francia
Liutgard of Saxony (died 953) (932–953), daughter of King Otto I of Germany, wife of Duke Conrad the Red of Lorraine and mother of Duke Otto I of Carinthia

See also
Liutgard (disambiguation)